The Yalqut Reubeni (Collection of Reuben) is a 17th-century collection of midrashim by Rabbi Reuben Hoschke Kohen first printed at Prague in 1660. The collection includes expansions of Rabbinical legends such as concerning Jannes and Jambres, Lilith, and so on.

References

Kabbalah
1660 books